The Silent Man is a 1917 American Western silent film directed by William S. Hart and written by Charles Kenyon. The film stars William S. Hart, Vola Vale, Robert McKim, Dorcas Matthews, J. P. Lockney, George Nichols, and Gertrude Claire. It was released on November 26, 1917, by Paramount Pictures. The movie premiered in Los Angeles at Sid Grauman's Million Dollar Theater.

Plot
As described in a film magazine, 'Silent' Budd Marr (Hart) comes to the town of Bakeoven to spend some of the gold for which he had labored so hard. Through Handsome Jack Pressley (McKim) he gets into a fight, and is confined to bed for a couple of weeks during which his claim is stolen. All efforts to regain his property are unsuccessful, so when he finds the claim jumpers loading their loot on the stage coach, he holds it up, and at the same time rescues Betty Bryce (Vale), a young woman Pressley had lured with the promise of marriage to work in his dance hall. As the girl learns the true nature of Pressley she is thankful and soon falls in love with Budd. A stranger known as Uncle Grubstake (Lockney) has become friendly with Bud and Betty's brother David (Goodwin), and when the citizens attempt to hang Budd for robbing the coach, Grubstake reveals his true identity as a federal agent, and has the evidence that gets Pressley and his gang arrested. Budd and Betty end up happy.

Cast 
 William S. Hart as 'Silent' Budd Marr
 Vola Vale as Betty Bryce 
 Robert McKim as Handsome Jack Pressley
 Dorcas Matthews as Topaz
 J. P. Lockney as 'Grubstake' Higgins
 George Nichols as Preachin' Bill Hardy
 Gertrude Claire as Mrs. Hardy
 Milton Ross as Ames Mitchell 
 Harold Goodwin as David Bryce

Reception
Like many American films of the time, The Silent Man was subject to cuts by city and state film censorship boards. For example, the Chicago Board of Censors required a cut, in Reel 1, of the intertitle "Region God left unfinished and cursed" etc., to flash five snake scenes, cut two scenes of young woman drinking at bar with men, five roulette scenes, flash adjustment of roulette wheel, from the intertitle "You ought to remember this dress" etc. remove the words "when I was good", Reel 2, the shooting of Hart, Reel 3, change holdup scenes to eliminate actual theft, Reel 4, eliminate three intertitles "Go get the change" etc., "You made a thief of me" etc., and "Now I will expose your hand" and replace with "You forced the act which made me appear a thief", and, Reel 5, two scenes of horse dragging Pressley.

Preservation
Copies of the film are in the Library of Congress and UCLA Film and Television Archive, and it has been released on DVD.

References

External links 
 
 

1917 films
1917 Western (genre) films
Paramount Pictures films
Films directed by William S. Hart
American black-and-white films
Censored films
Silent American Western (genre) films
1910s English-language films
1910s American films